The Tongan Ambassador in Beijing is the official representative of the Government in Nukualofa to the Government of China.

List of representatives 

 China–Tonga relations

References 

China
Tonga